Wyoming Highway 331 (WYO 331) is a  east-west Wyoming State Road located in central Sheridan County and links Beckton with Sheridan.

Route description
Wyoming Highway 331's western end is in the community of Beckton, west of Sheridan, at Sheridan County Route 53 (Big Goose Canyon Road). With the name Big Goose Canyon Road, it parallels Big Goose Creek to the north. For almost ten miles, between the outer limits of Sheridan and I-90 Business/US 14/US 87 (North Main Street) it is known as West Loucks Street.

Major intersections

See also

 List of state highways in Wyoming

References

External links

 Wyoming State Routes 300-399
 Wyoming Highway 331 - I-90 Bus/US-87/US-14 Bus to Sheridan CR 53

Transportation in Sheridan County, Wyoming
331